Fundamental analysis software automates analysis that supports fundamental analysts in their review of a company's financial statements and valuation.

Features

The following are the most common features of fundamental analysis applications.

Backtesting

Enables traders to test fundamental analysis strategies or algorithms to see what kind of return they would have achieved if they had invested based on that strategy or algorithm in the past. Backtest results will typically display total and annualized returns compared to a benchmark such as the S&P 500. In addition to returns, backtest results will also display volatility statistics such as average beta or maximum drawdown.

Scanner

Stock scanning, or screening, is the most common feature of fundamental analysis software. Scanners enable users to 'scan' the market, be it stocks, options, currencies etc., to identify investment opportunities that meet a user's specific investment criteria. Using a fundamental analysis scanner, a user could, for example, scan the market to identify stocks with below industry average PE Ratios and above industry average sales growth.

Alerts

Alerts are a common feature of fundamental analysis software. Alerts will typically notify the investor to buy or sell a stock, or notify an investor when a stock enters or exits his/her saved strategy. When alert conditions are met, a notification is typically communicated via an on screen pop up or sent as an email.

Data Feed

Fundamental analysis software is typically used with end of day (EOD), delayed or real time data feeds. EOD data feeds provide the end of day close, open, high, and low price for the given equity and is typically updated once a day at market close. Delayed data is typically delayed 15 to 30 minutes depending on the exchange and is the most commonly used data feed type. Real time data feeds provide tick by tick 'real time' data.

Built in Strategies

Most fundamental analysis software includes built in strategies that have been validated with backtesting to give positive returns on average. Some examples of built in strategies include: Stock Investor Pro's IBD Stable 70 or Equities Lab's Dividend Champions. Users will typically find a built in strategy that aligns with their interests and investment style then follow the strategy to keep up with stocks that pass the strategy.

Broker Interface

Some fundamental analysis software can be integrated with brokerage platforms to enable traders to place trades, or to update the users portfolio with what is actually held in the brokerage account.

References

Business software
Fundamental analysis